Xiaoying (Maggie) Han is a Chinese mathematician whose research concerns random dynamical systems, stochastic differential equations, and actuarial science. She is Marguerite Scharnagle Endowed Professor in Mathematics at Auburn University.

Education and career
Han graduated from the University of Science and Technology of China in 2001. She completed her Ph.D. in 2007 at the University at Buffalo. Her dissertation, Interlayer Mixing in Thin Film Growth, was supervised by Brian J. Spencer. She joined the Auburn faculty in 2007. She was promoted to full professor in 2017, and given the Marguerite Scharnagle Endowed Professorship in 2018.

In 2020 she was named a Fulbright Scholar, funding her for a research visit to Brazil in 2021.

Books
Han is the co-author of three books:
Applied Nonautonomous and Random Dynamical Systems (with T. Caraballo, Springer, 2016)
Attractors Under Discretisation (with P. E. Kloeden, Springer, 2017)
Random Ordinary Differential Equations and Their Numerical Solution (with P. E. Kloeden, Springer, 2017)

References

External links
Home page

Year of birth missing (living people)
Living people
Chinese mathematicians
Chinese women mathematicians
University of Science and Technology of China alumni
University at Buffalo alumni
Auburn University faculty